Humbert Wolfe CB CBE (5 January 1885 – 5 January 1940) was an Italian-born British poet, man of letters and civil servant.

Biography
Humbert Wolfe was born in Milan, Italy, and came from a Jewish family background, his father, Martin Wolff, being of German descent and his mother, Consuela, née Terraccini, Italian. He was brought up in Bradford, West Riding of Yorkshire and was a pupil at Bradford Grammar School. Wolfe attended Wadham College at the University of Oxford.

He was one of the most popular British authors of the 1920s. He was also a translator of Heinrich Heine, Edmond Fleg (1874–1963) and Eugene Heltai (Heltai Jenő). A Christian convert, he remained very aware of his Jewish heritage.

His career was in the Civil Service, beginning in the Board of Trade and then in the Ministry of Labour. By 1940 he had a position of high responsibility. His work was recognised with a CBE and then a CB.

Wolfe said in an interview with Twentieth Century Authors that he was "of no political creed, except that his general view is that money and its possessors should be abolished."

Wolfe's verses have been set to music by a number of composers, including Gustav Holst in his 12 Humbert Wolfe Songs, Op. 48 (1929).

He had a long-term affair with the novelist Pamela Frankau, while remaining married.

He died on his 55th birthday.

Though his works are little read today, the following epigram from The Uncelestial City continues to be widely known and quoted:

You cannot hope 
to bribe or twist,
thank God! the 
British journalist.
But, seeing what 
the man will do
unbribed, there's 
no occasion to.

In 2014–2015, five busts of the poet were created and sited by sculptor Anthony Padgett to mark the 75th anniversary of Wolfe's death.
The sculptures have been sited where Wolfe died in London – 75 Eccleston Square, where he studied – Wadham College Oxford, where there is a collection of his manuscripts – 
New York Public Library and where he grew up – Bradford Library and Bradford Grammar School.

Works
London Sonnets (1920)
Shylock Reasons with Mr. Chesterton and other poems (1920)
  Please note that a wikilink to the author's article on [Labour Supply and Regulation] in [EB1922] is not available
Circular Saws  (1923)
Labour Supply and Regulation (1923)
The Lilac (1924)
Lampoons (1925)
The Unknown Goddess  (1925) poems
Humoresque (1926)
News of the Devil (1926) poems
Requiem (1927) poems
Cursory Rhymes (1927) poems
Others Abide (1927) translator, Ancient Greek poems
Kensington Gardens (1924)
Dialogues and Monologues (1928) criticism
This Blind Rose (1928) poems
Troy (1928) Faber & Gwyer, Ariel poems
The Moon and Mrs. Misses Smith (1928)
The Craft of Verse (1928) essay
The Silver Cat and other poems (1928)
Notes on English Verse Satire (1929)
A Winter Miscellany (1930) editor, prose anthology, plus some original poems
Homage to Meleager (1930 Limited Edition)
Tennyson (1930) criticism of Maud
The Uncelestial City  (1930) poems
Early Poems (1930)
George Moore (1931) biography
Snow (1931) poems
Signpost to Poetry (1931)
Reverie of Policeman: A ballet in three acts (1933)
Now a Stranger (1933) autobiography
Romantic and Unromantic Poetry  (1933)
Truffle Eater. Pretty Stories and funny pictures An anti-Nazi parody of the famous Struwwelpeter, published under the alias "Oistros", with pictures by Archibald Louis Charles Savory (1933)
Portraits by Inference  (1934) biographical sketches
Sonnets pour Helene (by Ronsard) (1934) translator
X at Oberammergau : A poem (1935) drama
The Fourth of August (1935) poems
Selected Lyrics of Heinrich Heine (1935) translator
P. L. M.: Peoples Landfalls Mountains  (1936)
The Pilgrim's Way (1936)
Personalities; a selection from the writings of A. A. Baumann (1936) editor, biographical sketches by Arthur A. Baumann
The Silent Knight: A Romantic Comedy in Three Acts (by Eugene Heltai)(1937)
Others Abide: Translated Greek Epigrams (1937)
The Upward Anguish (1938) autobiography
Out of Great Tribulation (1939) poems
Kensington Gardens in War-Time (1940) poems
Cyrano de Bergerac (1941) by Edmond Rostand translator

References

Other sources

Bagguley, Philip (1997). Harlequin in Whitehall: a Life of Humbert Wolfe, Poet and Civil Servant 1885-1940. London: Nyala Publications, 
Helen Ferris, Favorite Poems Old and New (1957).

External links
 

1885 births
1940 deaths
Writers from Bradford
Alumni of Wadham College, Oxford
Italian emigrants to the United Kingdom
Converts to Christianity from Judaism
Civil servants in the Board of Trade
Civil servants in the Ministry of Labour
Commanders of the Order of the British Empire
Companions of the Order of the Bath
People educated at Bradford Grammar School
English male poets
20th-century English poets
20th-century English male writers